Mary Thorne  was one of the first women to have a leadership role in the Methodist movement in the United States.

Mary Thorne may also refer to:

Mary Thorne, character in The Amazing Transplant
Mary Thorne, character in Doctor Thorne